In enzymology, an o-dihydroxycoumarin 7-O-glucosyltransferase is an enzyme that catalyzes the chemical reaction

UDP-glucose + 7,8-dihydroxycoumarin  UDP + daphnin

Thus, the two substrates of this enzyme are UDP-glucose and 7,8-dihydroxycoumarin, whereas its two products are UDP and daphnin.

This enzyme belongs to the family of glycosyltransferases, specifically the hexosyltransferases.  The systematic name of this enzyme class is UDP-glucose:7,8-dihydroxycoumarin 7-O-beta-D-glucosyltransferase. Other names in common use include uridine diphosphoglucose-o-dihydroxycoumarin, 7-O-glucosyltransferase, and UDP-glucose:o-dihydroxycoumarin glucosyltransferase.

References

 

EC 2.4.1
Enzymes of unknown structure